The Journal of Logic, Language and Information is a quarterly peer-reviewed academic journal covering research on "natural, formal, and programming languages". It is the official journal of the European Association for Logic, Language and Information and was established in 1974. It is published by Springer Science+Business Media and the editor-in-chief is Lawrence S. Moss (Indiana University). According to the Journal Citation Reports, the journal has a 2020 impact factor of 0.829.

References

External links

Logic journals
Linguistics journals
Springer Science+Business Media academic journals
Publications established in 1974
Quarterly journals
English-language journals